Helen Simpson (born 1957) is an English novelist and short story writer.

Early life and education
She was born in Bristol, in the West of England, and grew up first in Wealdstone then in a suburb of Croydon where she went to a girls' school. Her mother was a primary-school teacher and her father was a naval architect who later taught. The first from her family to go to university, she read English at Oxford University where she wrote a thesis on Restoration farce.

Career
She worked at Vogue for five years before her success in writing short stories meant she could afford to leave and concentrate full-time on her writing. Her first collection, Four Bare Legs in a Bed and Other Stories, 1990, won the Somerset Maugham Award and the Sunday Times Young Writer of the Year Award, and was followed by a second collection, Dear George, in 1995. Hey Yeah Right Get A Life, 2000, a series of interlinked stories, won the Hawthornden Prize, and was renamed Getting a Life for its US publication. She was awarded the E.M. Forster Award in 2002 by the American Academy of Arts and Letters. Her most recent story collections are: Constitutional (2005), renamed In the Driver's Seat for its US publication; In-Flight Entertainment (2010); and Cockfosters (2015). A Bunch of Fives: Selected Stories was published in 2012.

In 1993, she was selected as one of Granta's top 20 novelists under the age of 40.

In 2007, she published Homework short story. In 2009, she donated the short story The Tipping Point to Oxfam's 'Ox-Tales' project, four collections of UK stories written by 38 authors. Her story was published in the 'Air' collection.
She was a writer-in-residence for the charity First Story.

Many of her stories have been broadcast on BBC Radio, including Café Society and Hurrah for the Hols read by Tamsin Greig and abridged and produced by Amber Barnfather.

In 2011, she was awarded a PEN/O.Henry Prize for her story "Diary of an Interesting Year". She is a Fellow of the Royal Society of Literature.

References

Sources
Mslexia—Issue 35
Short Fiction in Theory and Practice Volume 1 Number 1

External links
 Official website
Biography at Contemporary Writers
Helen Simpson at BBC World Service

1959 births
Living people
English short story writers
Writers from Bristol
Fellows of the Royal Society of Literature
20th-century English novelists
20th-century English women writers
21st-century English women writers
British women short story writers
English women novelists
20th-century British short story writers
21st-century British short story writers